Rob Roy usually refers to the Scottish hero Rob Roy MacGregor (1671–1734).

Rob Roy may also refer to:

Places 
Rob Roy, Indiana, a small town in Fountain County, Indiana, US
Rob Roy, Victoria, a district of the town of Christmas Hills, Victoria, Australia
Rob Roy Island, an island in the Solomon Islands
Rob Roy Way, a long-distance footpath in Scotland
Rob Roy Glacier, a glacier on New Zealand's South Island
Rob Roy, Ontario, a hamlet in Grey County, Ontario, Canada

Works related to Rob Roy MacGregor
 Rob Roy (novel), an 1817 novel by Walter Scott based on MacGregor's life
 Rob Roy (play), an 1818 play based on the novel
 Rob Roy Overture, a musical composition by Hector Berlioz inspired by the novel, composed in 1831 and first performed at the Paris Conservatoire on 14 April 1833
 Rob Roy (operetta), an 1894 operetta by Reginald De Koven and Harry B. Smith
 Rob Roy (1922 film), a silent film starring David Hawthorne
 Rob Roy: The Highland Rogue, a 1953 film starring Richard Todd and Glynis Johns
 Rob Roy (1987 film), a 1987 animated film produced by Burbank Films Australia
 Rob Roy (1995 film), starring Liam Neeson and Jessica Lange

Ships
Rob Roy 23, an American sailboat design
CSS Rob Roy, a Confederate blockade runner
PS Rob Roy, the first seaworthy steamship

Sports
Kirkintilloch Rob Roy F.C., a football club from Kirkintilloch, Scotland
Rob Roy F.C., a defunct football club from Callander, Scotland
Rob Roy Boat Club, a rowing club on the River Cam, Cambridge, United Kingdom

Other uses 
Rob Roy, the nickname of John MacGregor and also the boats that he designed
Rob Roy (cocktail), created in conjunction with the premiere of  De Koven' and Smith's Rob Roy operetta (1894) 
Rob Roy (dog), a collie owned by Calvin Coolidge
Rob Roy (Seattle), a bar in the U.S. state of Washington
Norman Fox & The Rob-Roys, a doo-wop group
 Rob Roy, CEO and co-founder of Switch

See also 
 Mount Rob Roy, a mountain, adjacent to the Canberra suburb of Banks in the Australian Capital Territory
 Robert Roy (1906–2000), American mechanical engineer and the former Dean of Engineering Science at Johns Hopkins University
 Robert Roy (cricketer), New Zealand cricketer